Malka Hans, is a historical town of Punjab in Pakistan. It is located 12 kilometers north of Pakpattan in the Pakpattan District.

History

Waris Shah, a poet from the Punjab, came here from his native village Jandiala Sher Khan and composed the classic epic Heer in 1766. There is a mosque related to the poet as well as his composition. Molvi Sh. Abdullah who wrote BaaraaN Anwaa, a famous Punjabi book on fiqh, also belonged to Malka Hans. He came to Lahore and lived in Sheran Wali Gali inside Lohari Darvaza, where Mian Muhammad Bakhsh stayed for three months. Mian Muhammad Bakhsh Ji wrote 64 couplets about him at the end of his famous Punjabi Sufi poetry book Saiful Maluk. (Edited by Prof. Saeed Ahmad, Rwp). politician (Hans Family / Khagha Family and doger family) is the corrupted  politician in this area they even not try to solve saverage and water problem since 25 years  , they always say thief to each other but in realty they are same blood group.

Geography

It is located on the Pakpattan-Sahiwal road, approximately 15 km from Pakpattan and 34 km from Sahiwal.

References

Populated places in Pakpattan District